A compressometer is a device used to determine the strain or deformation of a specimen while measuring the compressive strength of concrete specimens, generally a cylinder.  It can be used for rock, concrete, soils, and other materials.  For concrete, the device  usually comprises two steel rings for clamping to the specimen and two gauge length bars attached to the ring. When the compressive load is applied, the strain value is registered from the compressometer. Generally, a data logger is used to record the strain.

The stress strain curve is then used to determine the static Young's modulus of elasticity and Poisson's ratio of concrete. ASTM C469 describes about the instrument.

See also
 Extensometer
 Strain gauge

References

 ASTM International C469 Standard Test Method for Static Modulus of Elasticity and Poisson's Ratio of Concrete in Compression

Materials testing
Test equipment
Measuring instruments